Augusto Ezequiel Aguirre (born 2 August 1999) is an Argentine professional footballer who plays as a centre-back for San Martín SJ, on loan from River Plate.

Career
Aguirre played for Club Alvear in his hometown, which preceded him joining Boca Unidos. In 2015, River Plate signed Aguirre. He was selected for his debut at the age of eighteen midway through the 2017–18 Primera División season, with Marcelo Gallardo playing the defender for the full duration of a 4–0 away loss on 28 October 2017 against Talleres. He wouldn't appear for the club across the next three seasons, though did make the substitute's bench four times in 2020–21. 

February 2021 saw Aguirre depart on loan to fellow Primera División club Godoy Cruz. He debuted in a home win over newly promoted Platense on 6 March. In January 2022, Aguirre was loaned out once again, this time to Primera Nacional side San Martín SJ until the end of the year.

Career statistics
.

Notes

References

External links

1999 births
Living people
People from Corrientes
Argentine footballers
Association football defenders
Argentine Primera División players
Club Atlético River Plate footballers
Godoy Cruz Antonio Tomba footballers
San Martín de San Juan footballers
Sportspeople from Corrientes Province